Anton Marklund (born December 9, 1992) is a Swedish racecar driver who won the 2017 FIA European Rallycross Championship. He has competed most of his career for his father's team Marklund Motorsport.

Career

Marklund entered five rounds of the 2011 European Rallycross Championship for Marklund Motorsport with a Ford Fiesta TouringCar, scoring a third-place finish at Sweden. In the 2011 European Rallycross Championship he scored two wins and six second-place finishes, claiming the TouringCar title.

For the 2013 European Rallycross Championship, Marklund moved to the Supercar to drive a Volkswagen Polo, finishing seventh in points.

Marklund raced the 2014 FIA World Rallycross Championship for Marklund Motorsport in a Volkswagen Polo Supercar. He made 5 finals, including a career-best 2nd in Canada. He ended the season 6th in the points, having scored points in every event.

In 2015, Marklund raced at the FIA World Rallycross Championship with Mattias Ekström's team, EKS RX, driving an Audi S1 at races except Canada, where he drove a Volkswagen Polo. He endured a tough start to the season, rolling in the season opener in Portugal and launched off Daniel Holten in Sweden. He finished the season strongly, with a 6th in Turkey and a 4th in Italy. Also in 2015, Marklund also ran in the Audi Sport TT Cup, finishing 16th in the standings with 63 points and a best finish of 8th.

For the 2016 FIA World Rallycross Championship, Kristoffersson Motorsport and Marklund Motorsport combined their operations to participate under the brand Volkswagen RX Sweden. Driving a Volkswagen Polo Supercar, Marklund finished 13th in points, with best results of fourth at Belgium and Sweden.

He left the World Rallycross Championship in 2017, and returned to the European Rallycross Championship with Marklund Motorsport. He won the title with three wins in five races.

Racing record

Complete FIA European Rallycross Championship results
(key)

TouringCar

Supercar/RX1

Complete FIA World Rallycross Championship results
(key)

Supercar/RX1/RX1e

References

External links

 

Living people
Swedish racing drivers
European Rallycross Championship drivers
World Rallycross Championship drivers
Audi Sport TT Cup drivers
1992 births
Porsche Motorsports drivers